Derek James Coughlan (born 2 January 1977 in Cork) is an Irish former footballer.

Coughlan played youth football in his native Cork for local teams Douglas Hall and Casement Celtic and also played minor Gaelic football for Cork GAA.

Coughlan joined his home town club Cork City in May 1996 from Brighton & Hove Albion, where he had made one Football League appearance. He scored his first goal for Cork on 28 December 1997 in a dramatic 4-4 draw against Shelbourne and entered Cork folklore by scoring the winning goal in the 1998 FAI Cup final replay at Dalymount Park.

In summer 2002, he joined Stephen Kenny's Bohemians, where he was dubbed 'The Brute' for his robust performances, and played a huge role in their title win that season. Midway through the 2003 season, he fell out of favour at the club and returned to Cork City when he earned another League winners medal in 2005.

Coughlan represented Ireland at Under-20 and Under-21 level.

Honours
League of Ireland: 2
 Bohemians - 2002/03
 Cork City - 2005
FAI Cup: 1
 Cork City - 1998
FAI League Cup: 1
 Cork City - 1998/9

References 

Republic of Ireland association footballers
League of Ireland players
Bohemian F.C. players
Cork City F.C. players
Republic of Ireland under-21 international footballers
1977 births
Living people
Association football central defenders
Brighton & Hove Albion F.C. players
English Football League players